Tornier's frog (Litoria tornieri) is a species of frog in the subfamily Pelodryadinae. It is endemic to Australia.

Habitat
Its natural habitats are subtropical or tropical dry forests, subtropical or tropical swamps, dry or moist savanna, subtropical or tropical dry lowland grassland, swamps, intermittent freshwater lakes, and intermittent freshwater marshes.

References

Further reading
Boulenger, G.A. 1882. Catalogue of the Batrachia Salientia s. Ecaudata in the Collection of the British Museum. Second Edition. Trustees of the British Museum. (Taylor and Francis, printers.) London. xvi + 503 pp. + Plates I.- XXX. (Hyla affinis, p. 413 + Plate XXVI., Figure 3.)
Gray, J.E. 1842. Descriptions of some hitherto unrecorded species of Australian reptiles and batrachians. Zool. Misc., Part 2: 51–57. (Pelodytes affinis, p. 56.)
Nieden, F. 1923. Subordo Aglossa und Phaneroglossa. Anura 1. Das Tierreich 46: 1–584. (Hyla tornieri, p. 228.)

Litoria
Amphibians of Western Australia
Amphibians of the Northern Territory
Amphibians described in 1923
Taxonomy articles created by Polbot
Frogs of Australia